American Airlines Flight 1 was a regularly-scheduled domestic passenger flight. On January 14, 1936, a Douglas DC-2 airliner, operating the flight that day on its then Memphis to Little Rock route, crashed 14 minutes after departure. All aboard, including 14 passengers and 3 crew, were killed. The cause of the crash remains undetermined. As of 2022, it remains the deadliest crash in Arkansas state history. It was the first of three fatal crashes during an operation of American Airlines Flight 1.

Aircraft

The aircraft was a Douglas DC-2-120, registered as NC14274. Its first flight was in 1934. The aircraft was known as the Southerner.

Passengers and crew

The flight was piloted by Captain Jerry Marshall and First Officer Glenn Freeland. Perla Gasparini was the only stewardess on board the plane. Also onboard was William Reynolds Dyess, the Works Progress Administration (WPA) state administrator for Arkansas; Robert H. McNair Jr, the Work Progress Administration director of finance and reports for Arkansas; Frank C. Hart, a "millionare oil man"; and 8 other passengers.

Accident

On Tuesday, January 14, 1936, at 7:04 p.m., the aircraft departed from Memphis Municipal Airport. The last contact with the flight crew was at 7:18 p.m. as the aircraft was heading towards Little Rock. The aircraft later crashed into a swamp near Goodwin, Arkansas, about two miles north of U.S. Highway 70, disintegrating on impact and killing all 17 people on board. The wreckage was scattered over 400 yards in four or five feet of water. The crash was the 7th hull loss and 5th fatal accident of the Douglas DC-2. At the time, it was the worst civil plane crash on U.S. soil.

Investigation

The U.S. Commerce Department appointed a board of inquiry led by Eugene T. Vidal to investigate the accident. At that time, there were different theories as to what happened on the aircraft, such as a piece of metal that appeared to have a bullet hole on it according to the Arkansas Gazette, or someone who may have hindered the pilot's actions while flying. On February 22, the board ruled out the possibility of a "purely mechanical failure". On March 7, the final report was issued and stated that flying at a low altitude, an interference with the pilots' sight by a passenger in the cockpit, the switching of an empty gas tank for a full one that may have caused a sudden drop into the tree line, and the First Officer being "momentarily confused due to some minor difficulty" if he was alone in the cockpit all may have contributed to the cause of this accident, but the probable cause or causes thereof cannot be determined.

Lawsuits

Due to the accident, at least three lawsuits were filed against American Airlines. The family of stewardess Perla Gasparini filed a federal lawsuit for undisclosed damages, the widow of crash victim Nathan Porter sued for $16,000 and the estate of Frank C. Hart settled a claim for $42,500.

References

1936 in Arkansas
Aviation accidents and incidents in 1936
Airliner accidents and incidents with an unknown cause
Airliner accidents and incidents in Arkansas
Accidents and incidents involving the Douglas DC-2
Aviation accidents and incidents in the United States in 1936